Sin La Habana  is a Canadian drama film, directed by Kaveh Nabatian and released in 2020.

The film stars Yonah Acosta as Leonardo, a ballet dancer in Cuba who feels stifled and in need of emigration to another country to advance his career. He and his girlfriend Sara (Evelyn O’Farrill) devise a plan for the duo to get out of Cuba by having Leonardo seduce Nasim (Aki Yaghoubi), a tourist from Montreal, so that she will take him back to Canada with her and then he can send for Sara once he's settled in; however, both Leonardo and Sara are secretly also looking for ways to break off their relationship.

The film premiered at the 2020 Festival du nouveau cinéma, before going into commercial release in September 2021.

Sin la Habana received positive reviews from film critics. It holds a 86% rating on review aggregator website Rotten Tomatoes.

Accolades

References

External links

2020 films
Canadian drama films
Films set in Cuba
Films set in Montreal
Films shot in Cuba
Films shot in Montreal
Quebec films
English-language Canadian films
Spanish-language Canadian films
2020s Canadian films